The centenary of the Easter Rising occurred in 2016. Many events occurred to mark the occasion. Note that Easter Day fell on 27 March in 2016 and on 23 April in 1916. The Rising began on Easter Monday, 24 April 1916.

Events
On 20 January, Ireland's first ever commemorative €2 coin went into circulation to mark the centenary year of the Easter Rising. It was designed by Emmet Mullins and featured, alongside the two years, a statue of Hibernia aboard the General Post Office and the word Hibernia in Book of Kells-influenced lettering.

A weekend of commemorations marking the occasion began on Easter Eve (26 March), as President of Ireland Michael D. Higgins laid a wreath at the Garden of Remembrance in Dublin. This was preceded by traditional Irish song "The Parting Glass" being performed by the Island of Ireland Peace Choir and succeeded by a minute's silence. Acting Taoiseach Enda Kenny and Acting Tánaiste Joan Burton were also present. Relatives of the dead were there too and were only permitted to lay their own wreaths when President Higgins was done.

Later that day, President Higgins gave a keynote address at a ceremony in the Royal Dublin Society and met relatives of the dead, 4,000 of whom attended. President Higgins later attended a 1916 commemoration concert at Liberty Hall Theatre. On the same day, Acting Taoiseach Enda Kenny and Acting Arts Minister Heather Humphreys opened a permanent visitor centre at the General Post Office, scene of rebel occupation in 1916. Also attending was former Taoiseach Liam Cosgrave, whose father W. T. Cosgrave reopened the building in 1929 after it was put back together. A commemorative service was held at the Unitarian Church on St Stephen's Green, with the names of all Dublin fatalities read aloud.

The Easter Rising centenary parade occurred in Dublin city on Easter Day, 27 March. It was shown live on RTÉ and attended by such dignitaries as President Michael D. Higgins, Sabina Higgins, Taoiseach Enda Kenny, his wife, the Garda Commissioner Nóirín O'Sullivan, Ceann Comhairle Seán Ó Fearghaíl, former Presidents Mary Robinson and Mary McAleese, former Taoisigh Bertie Ahern (accompanied by his brother Noel Ahern), Brian Cowen and Liam Cosgrave, Fianna Fáil leader Micheál Martin and Martin McGuinness (representing the Office of the First Minister and deputy First Minister).

On Easter Monday (28 March), President Higgins and Acting Taoiseach Enda Kenny laid wreaths at the Stone Breakers' Yard in Kilmainham Gaol, scene of the 1916 executions. Before this occurred, the Flag of Ireland was lowered to half mast in front of Defence Forces personnel and relatives of the dead. Afterwards, there was a minute's silence, the "Piper’s Lament" and the "Last Post" were played, then Army captain Glen Harmon held aloft a shining sword to serve as an introduction to the national anthem. Tánaiste Joan Burton, defence minister Simon Coveney, justice minister Frances Fitzgerald, Fianna Fáil leader Micheál Martin and Martin McGuinness were also present. That evening, RTÉ broadcast the 85-minute show Centenary, directed by Cillian Fennell, live from the Bord Gáis Energy Theatre; it had dance troupes, filmed pieces of people all across the world reading the Proclamation of the Irish Republic, and among the singers appearing were Imelda May, Dónal Lunny, Sharon Shannon and Colm Wilkinson.

On 3 April, a "remembrance wall" was unveiled at Glasnevin Cemetery. It included names of soldiers and civilians who died during the Easter Rising. However, a spelling mistake on the monument was quickly spotted; the first word Éirí ("rising") appeared as Eírí. The unveiling was shown live on RTÉ and acting Taoiseach Enda Kenny laid a wreath.

Silver and gold commemorative coins to mark the centenary, designed by Michael Guilfoyle, went on sale on Monday 4 April. They were only made available to collectors, and did not go into general circulation.

On Sunday 24 April, events occurred to mark the centenary date of the start of the Rising. President Higgins, Taoiseach Kenny, members of the Government, Oireachtas and judiciary attended a ceremony at Arbour Hill, where a requiem Mass was overseen by the Roman Catholic Archbishop of Dublin Diarmuid Martin. The graveside of the executed leaders hosted an interfaith ceremony and President Higgins laid another wreath. Representatives of the Defence Forces were present at the General Post Office to raise the Flag of Ireland aloft at midday. Local events were held nationwide, including at Pearse's Cottage in Rosmuc, in Carrick-on-Shannon (Seán Mac Diarmada, the second signatory of the Proclamation of Independence, was born in Kiltyclogher) and in Sligo (close to the estate of Constance Markievicz). Meanwhile, crowds thronged Croke Park for the Gaelic Athletic Association's Laochra, a theatrical event which commenced following the day's finals of the 2016 National Football League. Abroad now, and on the same day Irish Americans gathered in Manhattan, New York, for the official U.S. commemoration of the centenary, with Minister for the Environment, Community and Local Government Alan Kelly representing the Government.

Commemorations marking the executions of the rebels occurred between Tuesday, 3 May and Thursday, 12 May.

References

External links
 Century Ireland online exhibition

 
2016 in theatre
Enda Kenny
History of County Galway
History of County Leitrim
History of County Sligo
History of Dublin (city)
Irish historical anniversaries
Michael D. Higgins